The 2009–10 Montreal Canadiens season was the team's 101st season of play and 93rd in the National Hockey League (NHL).

This season marked the 100th anniversary of the organization's founding in 1909. Coinciding with this, the Montreal Canadiens hosted the 2009 NHL All-Star Game at the Bell Centre on January 25, 2009 as well as the 2009 NHL Entry Draft that June leading up to the centennial anniversary of the franchise on December 4, 2009.

Qualifying for the 2010 Stanley Cup playoffs as the eighth and final seed, the Canadiens were able to upset the first-seeded Washington Capitals during the first round, and then eliminated the defending Stanley Cup champion Pittsburgh Penguins before falling to the Eastern Conference champion Philadelphia Flyers in five games.

Season events

Off-season 
The Canadiens announced Jacques Martin as their new head coach to replace Guy Carbonneau. Martin, the former coach and general manager of the Florida Panthers, and former coach of the Ottawa Senators and St. Louis Blues, is known for his defence-first style.

On June 20, the Canadiens announced that owner George Gillett had reached an agreement to sell his 80% share of the team, the Bell Centre and the Gillett concert promotion company to Geoffrey, Justin and Andrew Molson. This represents the third time that the hockey club will be owned by the Molson family, which owned it from 1957 to 1971 and from 1978 to 2001. The purchase price was not disclosed but was estimated at between $506 and 537 million. The deal was approved by the NHL board of governors on December 1.

At the Entry Draft, this year held in Montreal at the Bell Centre, the Canadiens made Louis Leblanc their first-round pick. The pick was notable as it was the Canadiens' first first-round pick of a francophone since the team picked Eric Chouinard in the 1998 Entry Draft. Leblanc was born in the Montreal suburb of Kirkland.

General manager Bob Gainey pursued a policy of change for the lineup. Prior to free agency, he traded for top centre Scott Gomez in a seven-player deal from the New York Rangers. In free agency, the Canadiens signed Gomez's former New Jersey linemate Brian Gionta, high-scoring Calgary Flames forward Michael Cammalleri, checking line winger Travis Moen, and three defencemen: Hal Gill from the Pittsburgh Penguins, Jaroslav Spacek from the Buffalo Sabres, and Paul Mara from the New York Rangers. Captain Saku Koivu was not offered a contract and instead signed with the Anaheim Ducks. Alexei Kovalev turned down a contract and signed with the Ottawa Senators. Mike Komisarek signed with the Toronto Maple Leafs and Tom Kostopoulos signed with the Carolina Hurricanes.

Regular season 
For the first time in franchise history, the Canadiens enter the regular season without a captain. On October 6, 2009, the Canadiens signed defenceman Marc-Andre Bergeron due to early injuries to Andrei Markov.

On December 28, 2009, forward Michael Cammalleri scored the 20,000th goal in franchise history in a game against the Ottawa Senators.

On February 8, general manager Bob Gainey announced his retirement as general manager of the club, staying on as advisor to the club. Assistant general manager Pierre Gauthier became the interim general manager. Gauthier and head coach Jacques Martin held the same positions with the Ottawa Senators in the late 1990s.

The Canadiens finished the regular season with the fewest power-play opportunities of all 30 teams with 261.

Playoffs 
In the Eastern Conference Quarterfinals, the Canadiens faced the winners of the 2009–10 Presidents' Trophy, the Washington Capitals, who had led the league with the most goals scored during the regular season (318) and the most points (121). Despite trailing 3–1 after the first four games, the Canadiens won the final three, holding the Capitals to three goals. Montreal went 3–1 on the road in the series.

In the Eastern Conference Semi-finals, the Canadiens faced the defending Stanley Cup champion Pittsburgh Penguins. Once again, the Canadiens found themselves trailing, this time 3–2. After edging the Penguins 4–3 at home in Game 6, the Canadiens jumped out to a 4–0 lead in Game 7 on the road and would go on to win by a final score of 5–2, thereby clinching the series 4–3.

In the Eastern Conference Final against the Philadelphia Flyers, the Canadiens were shut out by scores of 6–0 and 3–0 in the first two games. They came back and won Game 3 at home by a score of 5–1. Game 4 was scoreless until 5:41 of the second period, when Flyers forward Claude Giroux scored his seventh of the playoffs on an assist from Kimmo Timonen. Ville Leino would score at 14:53 of the same period and Giroux would seal the win with an empty-net goal with 1:13 remaining in the game. The 3–0 Flyers' win game them a 3–1 lead in the series. The Canadiens would open the scoring in Game 5 just 59 seconds into the game on Brian Gionta's ninth of the playoffs, but the Flyers took a 3–1 lead on a short-handed goal by Flyers' captain Mike Richards at 4:25 of the first period and even-strength goals 84 seconds apart by Arron Asham and Jeff Carter in the second period. The Canadiens cut the Flyer's lead to one on Scott Gomez's second of the playoffs (assisted by P. K. Subban and Brian Gionta) at 6:53 of the third period, but Jeff Carter would seal the 4–2 Flyers' win with an empty-net goal at 19:37 and give Philadelphia a 4–1 series win. The Canadiens' playoff performance was the franchise's best in 17 years. However, with this loss, the Canadiens failed to become champions during the 2000s. Having won at least one Stanley Cup in each decade since the 1910s, the 2000s was their first decade without a Cup, thus ending a nine-decade streak of at least one championship per decade.

Schedule and results

Preseason 

|- style="background:#cfc;"
| 1 || September 17 || Florida Panthers || 2–3 || Bell Centre || 21,273 || 1–0–0 ||
|- style="background:#cfc;"
| 2 || September 18 || Ottawa Senators || 1–2 || Bell Centre || 21,273 || 2–0–0 ||
|- style="background:#fbb;"
| 3 || September 19 || @ Ottawa Senators || 6–1 || Scotiabank Place || 17,931 || 2–1–0 ||
|- style="background:#fbb;"
| 4 || September 20 || @ Boston Bruins || 2–1 || Colisée Pepsi, Quebec City || 15,399 ||2–2–0 ||
|- style="background:#cfc;"
| 5 || September 21 || Pittsburgh Penguins || 3–4 || Bell Centre || 21,273 || 3–2–0 ||
|- style="background: #e1e1e1;"
| 6 || September 24 || Boston Bruins || 2–1 SO || Bell Centre || 21,273 || 3–2–1 ||
|- style="background:#cfc;"
| 7 || September 26|| Buffalo Sabres || 2–3 || Bell Centre || 21,273 || 4–2–1 ||
|-

Regular season 

|- style="background:#cfc;"
| 1 || October 1 || @ Toronto Maple Leafs || 4–3 OT || Air Canada Centre || 19,617 || 1–0–0 || 2 ||
|- style="background:#cfc;"
| 2 || October 3 || @ Buffalo Sabres || 2–1 OT || HSBC Arena || 18,690 || 2–0–0 || 4 ||
|- style="background:#fbb;"
| 3 || October 6 || @ Calgary Flames || 3–4 || Pengrowth Saddledome || 19,289 || 2–1–0 || 4 ||
|- style="background:#fbb;"
| 4 || October 7 || @ Vancouver Canucks || 1–7 || General Motors Place || 18,810 ||2–2–0 || 4 ||
|- style="background:#fbb;"
| 5 || October 10 || @ Edmonton Oilers || 2–3 || Rexall Place || 16,839 || 2–3–0 || 4 ||
|- style="background:#fbb;"
| 6 || October 15 || Colorado Avalanche || 2–3 || Bell Centre || 21,273 || 2–4–0 || 4 ||
|- style="background:#fbb;"
| 7 || October 17 || Ottawa Senators || 1–3 || Bell Centre || 21,273 || 2–5–0 || 4 ||
|- style="background:#cfc;"
| 8 || October 20 || Atlanta Thrashers || 2–1 SO || Bell Centre || 21,273 || 3–5–0 || 6 ||
|- style="background:#cfc;"
| 9 || October 22 || New York Islanders || 5–1 || Bell Centre || 21,273 || 4–5–0 || 8 ||
|- style="background:#cfc;"
| 10 || October 24 || New York Rangers || 5–4 OT || Bell Centre || 21,273 || 5–5–0 || 10 ||
|- style="background:#cfc;"
| 11 || October 26 || New York Islanders || 3–2 OT || Bell Centre || 21,273 || 6–5–0 || 12 ||
|- style="background:#fbb;"
| 12 || October 28 || @ Pittsburgh Penguins || 1–6 || Mellon Arena || 16,965 || 6–6–0 || 12 ||
|- style="background:#fbb;"
| 13 || October 30 || @ Chicago Blackhawks || 2–3 || United Center || 20,807 || 6–7–0 || 12 ||
|- style="background:#cfc;"
| 14 || October 31 || Toronto Maple Leafs || 5–4 SO || Bell Centre || 21,273 || 7–7–0 || 14 ||
|-

|- style="background:#fbb;"
| 15 || November 3 || Atlanta Thrashers || 5–4 || Bell Centre || 21,273 || 7–8–0 || 14 ||
|- style="background:#cfc;"
| 16 || November 5 || @ Boston Bruins || 1–2 SO || TD Garden || 17,565 || 8–8–0 || 16 ||
|- style="background:#fbb;"
| 17 || November 7 || Tampa Bay Lightning || 3–1 || Bell Centre || 21,273 || 8–9–0 || 16 ||
|- style="background:#fbb;"
| 18 || November 10 || Calgary Flames || 1–0 || Bell Centre || 21,273 || 8–10–0 || 16 ||
|- style="background:#cfc;"
| 19 || November 12 || @ Phoenix Coyotes || 2–4 || Jobing.com Arena || 10,064 || 9–10–0 || 18 ||
|- style="background:#fbb;"
| 20 || November 14 || @ Nashville Predators || 2–0 || Sommet Center || 15,604 || 9–11–0 || 18 ||
|- style="background:#cfc;"
| 21 || November 17 || Carolina Hurricanes || 2–3 SO || Bell Centre || 21,273 || 10–11–0 || 20 ||
|- style="background:#cfc;"
| 22 || November 20 || @ Washington Capitals || 2–3 || Verizon Center || 18,277 || 11–11–0 || 22 ||
|- style="background: #e1e1e1;"
| 23 || November 21 || Detroit Red Wings || 3–2 SO || Bell Centre || 21,273 || 11–11–1 || 23 ||
|- style="background:#cfc;"
| 24 || November 24 || Columbus Blue Jackets || 3–5 || Bell Centre || 21,273 || 12–11–1 || 25 ||
|- style="background:#fbb;"
| 25 || November 25 || @ Pittsburgh Penguins || 3–1 || Mellon Arena || 17,094 || 12–12–1 || 25 ||
|- style="background: #e1e1e1;"
| 26 || November 28 || Washington Capitals || 4–3 SO || Bell Centre || 21,273 || 12–12–2 || 26 ||
|-

|- style="background:#fbb;"
| 27 || December 1 || Toronto Maple Leafs || 3–0 || Bell Centre || 21,273 || 12–13–2 || 26 ||
|- style="background:#fbb;"
| 28 || December 3 || @ Buffalo Sabres || 6–2 || HSBC Arena || 18,690 || 12–14–2 || 26 ||
|- style="background:#cfc;"
| 29 || December 4 || Boston Bruins || 1–5 || Bell Centre || 21,273 || 13–14–2 || 28 ||
|- style="background:#cfc;"
| 30 || December 7 || Philadelphia Flyers || 1–3 || Bell Centre || 21,273 || 14–14–2 || 30 ||
|- style="background:#cfc;"
| 31 || December 8 || @ Ottawa Senators || 1–4 || Scotiabank Place || 18,866 || 15–14–2 || 32 ||
|- style="background:#fbb;"
| 32 || December 10 || Pittsburgh Penguins || 3–2 || Bell Centre || 21,273 || 15–15–2 || 32 ||
|- style="background: #e1e1e1;"
| 33 || December 12 || @ Atlanta Thrashers || 3–4 OT || Philips Arena || 16,616 || 15–15–3 || 33 ||
|- style="background:#fbb;"
| 34 || December 14 || Buffalo Sabres || 4–3 || Bell Centre || 21,273 || 15–16–3 || 33 ||
|- style="background:#fbb;"
| 35 || December 16 || @ New Jersey Devils || 2–1 || Prudential Center || 12,178 || 15–17–3 || 33 ||
|- style="background:#fbb;"
| 36 || December 17 || Minnesota Wild || 3–1 || Bell Centre || 21,273 || 15–18–3 || 33 ||
|- style="background:#cfc;"
| 37 || December 19 || @ New York Islanders || 0–3 || Nassau Coliseum || 7,842 || 16–18–3 || 35 ||
|- style="background:#cfc;"
| 38 || December 21 || @ Atlanta Thrashers || 3–4 OT || Philips Arena || 15,075 || 17–18–3 || 37 ||
|- style="background:#cfc;"
| 39 || December 23 || @ Carolina Hurricanes || 1–5 || RBC Center || 14,820 || 18–18–3 || 39 ||
|- style="background:#cfc;"
| 40 || December 26 || @ Toronto Maple Leafs || 2–3 OT || Air Canada Centre || 19,250 || 19–18–3 || 41 ||
|- style="background:#fbb;"
| 41 || December 28 || @ Ottawa Senators || 4–2 || Scotiabank Place || 20,369 || 19–19–3 || 41 ||
|- style="background:#cfc;"
| 42 || December 30 || @ Tampa Bay Lightning || 1–2 OT || St. Pete Times Forum || 18,441 || 20–19–3 || 43 ||
|- style="background:#cfc;"
| 43 || December 31 || @ Florida Panthers || 4–5 || BankAtlantic Center || 19,851 || 21–19–3 || 45 ||
|-

|- style="background:#fbb;"
| 44 || January 3 || Buffalo Sabres || 1–0 || Bell Centre || 21,273 || 21–20–3 || 45 ||
|- style="background:#fbb;"
| 45 || January 5 || @ Washington Capitals || 4–2 || Verizon Center || 18,277 || 21–21–3 || 45 ||
|- style="background:#cfc;"
| 46 || January 7 || Florida Panthers || 0–2 || Bell Centre || 21,273 || 22–21–3 || 47 ||
|- style="background: #e1e1e1;"
| 47 || January 9 || New Jersey Devils || 2–1 OT || Bell Centre || 21,273 || 22–21–4 || 48 ||
|- style="background:#cfc;"
| 48 || January 14 || Dallas Stars || 3–5 || Bell Centre || 21,273 || 23–21–4 || 50 ||
|- style="background:#fbb;"
| 49 || January 16 || Ottawa Senators || 4–2 || Bell Centre || 21,273 || 23–22–4 || 50 ||
|- style="background:#fbb;"
| 50 || January 17 || @ New York Rangers || 2–6 || Madison Square Garden || 18,200 || 23–23–4 || 50 ||
|- style="background: #e1e1e1;"
| 51 || January 20 || St. Louis Blues || 4–3 OT || Bell Centre || 21,273 || 23–23–5 || 51 ||
|- style="background:#cfc;"
| 52 || January 22 || @ New Jersey Devils || 3–1 || Prudential Center || 17,625 || 24–23–5 || 53 ||
|- style="background:#cfc;"
| 53 || January 23 || New York Rangers || 6–0 || Bell Centre || 21,273 || 25–23–5 || 55 ||
|- style="background:#fbb;"
| 54 || January 26 || @ Florida Panthers || 1–2 || BankAtlantic Center || 17,104 || 25–24–5 || 55 ||
|- style="background:#fbb;"
| 55 || January 27 || @ Tampa Bay Lightning || 0–3 || St. Pete Times Forum || 14,404 || 25–25–5 || 55 ||
|- style="background: #e1e1e1;"
| 56 || January 30 || @ Ottawa Senators || 2–3 OT || Scotiabank Place || 20,500 || 25–25–6 || 56 ||
|-

|- style="background:#cfc;"
| 57 || February 2 || Vancouver Canucks || 2–3 || Bell Centre || 21,273 || 26–25–6 || 58 ||
|- style="background:#cfc;"
| 58 || February 4 || @ Boston Bruins || 3–2 SO || TD Garden || 17,565 || 27–25–6 || 60 ||
|- style="background:#cfc;"
| 59 || February 6 || Pittsburgh Penguins || 3–5 || Bell Centre || 21,273 || 28–25–6 || 62 ||
|- style="background:#fbb;"
| 60 || February 7 || Boston Bruins || 3–0 || Bell Centre || 21,273 || 28–26–6 || 62 ||
|- style="background:#cfc;"
| 61 || February 10 || Washington Capitals || 5–6 OT || Bell Centre || 21,273 || 29–26–6 || 64 ||
|- style="background:#fbb;"
| 62 || February 12 || @ Philadelphia Flyers || 3–2 || Wachovia Center || 19,803 || 29–27–6 || 64 ||
|- style="background:#fbb;"
| 63 || February 13 || Philadelphia Flyers || 6–2 || Bell Centre || 21,273 || 29–28–6 || 64 ||
|-

|- style="background:#cfc;"
| 64 || March 2 || @ Boston Bruins || 1–4 || TD Garden || 17,565 || 30–28–6 || 66 ||
|- style="background:#fbb;"
| 65 || March 4 || @ San Jose Sharks || 3–2 || HP Pavilion || 17,562 || 30–29–6 || 66 ||
|- style="background:#cfc;"
| 66 || March 6 || @ Los Angeles Kings || 2–4 || Staples Center || 18,118 || 31–29–6 || 68 ||
|- style="background:#cfc;"
| 67 || March 7 || @ Anaheim Ducks || 3–4 SO || Honda Center || 15,883 || 32–29–6 || 70 ||
|- style="background:#cfc;"
| 68 || March 9 || Tampa Bay Lightning || 3–5 || Bell Centre || 21,273 || 33–29–6 || 72 ||
|- style="background:#cfc;"
| 69 || March 11 || Edmonton Oilers || 4–5 SO || Bell Centre || 21,273 || 34–29–6 || 74 ||
|- style="background:#cfc;"
| 70 || March 13 || Boston Bruins || 2–3 || Bell Centre || 21,273 || 35–29–6 || 76 ||
|- style="background:#cfc;"
| 71 || March 16 || @ New York Rangers || 1–3 || Madison Square Garden || 18,200 || 36–29–6 || 78 ||
|- style="background: #e1e1e1;"
| 72 || March 20 || @ Toronto Maple Leafs || 3–2 SO || Air Canada Centre || 19,538 || 36–29–7 || 79 ||
|- style="background:#fbb;"
| 73 || March 22 || Ottawa Senators || 2–0 || Bell Centre || 21,273 || 36–30–7 || 79 ||
|- style="background: #e1e1e1;"
| 74 || March 24 || @ Buffalo Sabres || 3–2 SO || HSBC Arena || 18,690 || 36–30–8 || 80 ||
|- style="background:#cfc;"
| 75 || March 25 || Florida Panthers || 1–4 || Bell Centre || 21,273 || 37–30–8 || 82 ||
|- style="background:#fbb;"
| 76 || March 27 || New Jersey Devils || 4–2 || Bell Centre || 21,273|| 37–31–8 || 82 ||
|- style="background:#fbb;"
| 77 || March 31 || Carolina Hurricanes || 1–2 || Bell Centre || 21,273 || 37–32–8 || 82 ||
|-

|- style="background:#cfc;"
| 78 || April 2 || @ Philadelphia Flyers || 0–1 || Wachovia Center || 19,801 || 38–32–8 || 84 ||
|- style="background:#cfc;"
| 79 || April 3 || Buffalo Sabres || 0–3 || Bell Centre || 21,273 || 39–32–8 || 86 ||
|- style="background: #e1e1e1;"
| 80 || April 6 || @ New York Islanders || 4–3 SO || Nassau Coliseum || 10,263 || 39–32–9 || 87 ||
|- style="background:#fbb;"
| 81 || April 8 || @ Carolina Hurricanes || 5–2 || RBC Center || 18,680 || 39–33–9 || 87 ||
|- style="background: #e1e1e1;"
| 82 || April 10 || Toronto Maple Leafs || 4–3 OT || Bell Centre || 21,273 || 39–33–10 || 88 ||
|-

|Legend:

|-
|2009–10 schedule

Playoffs 

|- style="background:#cfc;"
| 1 || April 15 || Montreal Canadiens || 3–2 || Washington Capitals || OT || Halak || 18,377 || Canadiens lead 1–0 ||
|- style="background:#fbb;"
| 2 || April 17 || Montreal Canadiens || 5–6 || Washington Capitals || OT || Halak || 18,377 || Series tied 1–1 ||
|- style="background:#fbb;"
| 3 || April 19 || Washington Capitals || 5–1 || Montreal Canadiens || || Halak || 21,273 || Capitals lead 2–1 ||
|- style="background:#fbb;"
| 4 || April 21 || Washington Capitals || 6–3 || Montreal Canadiens || || Price || 21,273 || Capitals lead 3–1 ||
|- style="background:#cfc;"
| 5 || April 23 || Montreal Canadiens || 2–1 || Washington Capitals || || Halak || 18,377 || Capitals lead 3–2 ||
|- style="background:#cfc;"
| 6 || April 26 || Washington Capitals || 1–4 || Montreal Canadiens || || Halak || 21,273 || Series tied 3–3 ||
|- style="background:#cfc;"
| 7 || April 28 || Montreal Canadiens || 2–1 || Washington Capitals || || Halak || 18,377 || Canadiens win 4–3 ||
|-

|- style="background:#fbb;"
| 1 || April 30 || Montreal Canadiens || 3–6 || Pittsburgh Penguins || || Halak || 17,132 || Penguins lead 1–0 ||
|- style="background:#cfc;"
| 2 || May 2 || Montreal Canadiens || 3–1 || Pittsburgh Penguins || || Halak || 17,132 || Series tied 1–1 ||
|- style="background:#fbb;"
| 3 || May 4 || Pittsburgh Penguins || 2–0 || Montreal Canadiens || || Halak || 21,273 || Penguins lead 2–1 ||
|- style="background:#cfc;"
| 4 || May 6 || Pittsburgh Penguins || 2–3 || Montreal Canadiens || || Halak || 21,273 || Series tied 2–2 ||
|- style="background:#fbb;"
| 5 || May 8 || Montreal Canadiens || 1–2 || Pittsburgh Penguins || || Halak || 17,132 || Penguins lead 3–2 ||
|- style="background:#cfc;"
| 6 || May 10 || Pittsburgh Penguins || 3–4 || Montreal Canadiens || || Halak || 21,273 || Series tied 3–3 ||
|- style="background:#cfc;"
| 7 || May 12 || Montreal Canadiens || 5–2 || Pittsburgh Penguins || || Halak || 17,132 || Canadiens win 4–3 ||
|-

|- style="background:#fcc;"
| 1 || May 16 || Montreal Canadiens || 0–6 || Philadelphia Flyers || || Halak || 19,927 || Flyers lead 1–0 ||
|- style="background:#fcc;"
| 2 || May 18 || Montreal Canadiens || 0–3 || Philadelphia Flyers || || Halak || 19,907 || Flyers lead 2–0 ||
|- style="background:#cfc;"
| 3 || May 20 || Philadelphia Flyers || 1–5 || Montreal Canadiens || || Halak || 21,273 || Flyers lead 2–1 ||
|- style="background:#fcc;"
| 4 || May 22 || Philadelphia Flyers || 3–0 || Montreal Canadiens || || Halak || 21,273 || Flyers lead 3–1 ||
|- style="background:#fcc;"
| 5 || May 24 || Montreal Canadiens || 2–4 || Philadelphia Flyers || || Halak || 19,986 || Flyers win 4–1 ||
|-

|Legend:

Standings

Divisional standings

Conference standings

Player stats

Skaters 
Note: GP = Games played; G = Goals; A = Assists; Pts = Points; +/− = Plus/minus; PIM = Penalty minutes

Goaltenders 
Note: GP = Games played; TOI = Time on ice (minutes); W = Wins; L = Losses; OT = Overtime losses; GA = Goals against; GAA= Goals against average; SA= Shots against; SV= Saves; Sv% = Save percentage; SO= Shutouts

†Denotes player spent time with another team before joining Canadiens. Stats reflect time with Canadiens only.
‡Traded mid-season. Stats reflect time with Canadiens only.

Awards and records

Milestones

Awards

Transactions 
The Canadiens were involved in the following transactions during the 2009–10 season.

Trades

Free agents acquired

Free agents lost

Claimed via waivers

Lost via waivers

Lost via retirement

Player signings

Draft picks 
Montreal's picks at the 2009 NHL Entry Draft in Montreal, Quebec.

Farm teams

Hamilton Bulldogs 
The Hamilton Bulldogs remain Montreal's top affiliate in the American Hockey League in 2009–10.

Cincinnati Cyclones 
Montreal continues their affiliation alongside the Nashville Predators for the Cincinnati Cyclones of the ECHL in 2009–10.

Broadcasting

See also 
 2009–10 NHL season

References 

Montreal Canadiens seasons
Montreal Canadiens season, 2009-10
Mon